Maria Gigova (born 24 April 1947) is a Bulgarian rhythmic gymnast. She is a three-time (1969, 1971, 1973) World All-around champion.

Biography 

She was the first gymnast to become a triple world champion in rhythmic gymnastics with her titles in 1969, 1971, and 1973. Gigova has a total of four gold medals in hoop (1967, 1969, 1971 and 1973), an achievement still unmatched by any other gymnast, as well as one title in rope (1971) and free exercise (1969). As a member of the Bulgarian Team, she also earned team titles at the rhythmic gymnastics world championships in 1969 and 1971. Gigova shared the world crown in the all-around in 1971 with Soviet Galima Shugurova, Both of their ribbon routines at this Championship were to the same music – a piece from Bizet's ballet "Carmen". She was Bulgaria's first World champion and helped expand and influence the growth of rhythmic gymnastics in Bulgaria.

Gigova retired from gymnastics in 1974. After she finished her education at the National Sports Academy in Sofia, She became a member of the FIG Technical Committee, a post she held from 1978 to 1992. In 1978 she was appointed vice-president of the Bulgarian Rhythmic Gymnastics Federation, to become the federation's president in 1982. Gigova served on the Administrative Council of the Bulgarian Rhythmic Gymnastics Federation from 1989 to 1999 when she was elected president of the federation again. Since 2000, Gigova has again been a member of the Technical Committee of FIG.

On 4 May 2017, Gigova received the Order of Stara Planina (1st class) from president Rumen Radev for her contributions to developing Bulgarian sport.

Achievements 

 Gigova was the first rhythmic gymnast to win 3 consecutive world titles in (1969, 1971 tied with Galima Shugurova, 1973). She was later equaled by fellow countrywoman Maria Petrova (1993, 1994, 1995 tied with Ekaterina Serebryanskaya) and Russian gymnasts Evgenia Kanaeva (2009, 2010, 2011), Yana Kudryavtseva (2013, 2014, 2015) but they won their titles when the world championships were held every year.
 First Bulgarian to win the World Championships.
 In 1972 she was awarded the title of Merited Master of Sport of the USSR.

References

External links
 
 
 NSA Bulgarian gymnasts
 

1947 births
Living people
Bulgarian rhythmic gymnasts
Gymnasts from Sofia
Honoured Masters of Sport of the USSR
Medalists at the Rhythmic Gymnastics World Championships